Yenice Dam is a dam on the Sakarya River near Yenice on the border of Eskişehir and Ankara Province, Turkey. It houses a 38 MW hydroelectric power station. It was constructed between 1985 and 2000. The development was backed by the Turkish State Hydraulic Works.

See also

 Gökçekaya Dam – next upstream
 Sarıyar Dam – upstream of Gökçekaya Dam
List of dams and reservoirs in Turkey

References
DSI directory, State Hydraulic Works (Turkey), Retrieved December 16, 2009

Dams in Eskişehir Province
Dams in Ankara Province
Hydroelectric power stations in Turkey
Dams completed in 2000
Energy infrastructure completed in 2000